Donald James Pringle (1 May 1932 – 4 October 1975) was a British landscaper and a Kenyan international cricketer who represented East Africa at the 1975 Cricket World Cup. He was born in England and moved to Kenya in the late 1950s. His son Derek Pringle played international cricket for England.

Personal life
Pringle was born on 1 May 1932 in Prestwich, Lancashire, England. He had two children with his wife Dora, whom he married in England. He moved to Kenya in the late 1950s to work as a landscaper, eventually ending up at the Nairobi Parks Department. He laid the first turf for the Nairobi Club Ground.

Cricket career
In England, Pringle played club cricket for Prestwich. After moving to Kenya he played for Nairobi Civil Service, the Nairobi Club, Parklands Sports Club and Limuru. He was an opening bowler.

Pringle's first recorded match for Kenya came against Uganda in December 1958. He represented Kenya and several invitational teams against the Marylebone Cricket Club (MCC) on its 1963-64 tour of East Africa, notably dismissing England players Willie Watson, Colin Milburn and Micky Stewart. In 1967, he scored 52 not out and took 4/99 against India, returning from its unsuccessful tour of England.

At the 1975 Cricket World Cup in England, Pringle opened the bowling in East Africa's matches against India and England, missing the first game against New Zealand due to injury. He failed to take a wicket in either match, both of which were accorded One Day International (ODI) status.

Death
Pringle was killed in a road accident on 4 October 1975, aged 43. He was returning to Nairobi after playing a club cricket match for Limuru against Impala, where he took figures of 6/16. He was the first ODI cricketer to die.

References

External links
 

1932 births
1975 deaths
East African cricketers
East Africa One Day International cricketers
Kenyan cricketers
English cricketers
Sportspeople from Prestwich
Cricketers at the 1975 Cricket World Cup
British emigrants to Kenya
Road incident deaths in Kenya